Elections to Barrow-in-Furness Borough Council were held on 6 May 1999.  The whole council was up for election with boundary changes since the last election in 1998. The Labour party lost overall control of the council to no overall control.

Results

References
1999 Barrow-in-Furness election result

1999 English local elections
1999
1990s in Cumbria